Metaxygnathus is an extinct genus of ichthyostegalian found in Late Devonian deposits of New South Wales, Australia .
It is known only from a lower jawbone. Previously thought to be a lobe-finned fish, it has now been reassigned to the earliest group of tetrapods.

References

Campbell, K.S.W. and M.W. Bell. 1977. "A primitive amphibian from the Late Devonian of New South Wales." Alcheringa 1: 369–382.

External links
 Metaxygnathus denticulatus at Devonian Times

Ichthyostegalia
Prehistoric amphibians of Australia
Paleozoic vertebrates of Oceania
Devonian animals of Australia
Late Devonian animals
Devonian Oceania
Fossil taxa described in 1977
Prehistoric tetrapod genera
Fauna of New South Wales
Famennian genera